is a Japanese footballer currently playing as a forward for Azul Claro Numazu.

Career statistics

Club
.

Notes

References

External links

1997 births
Living people
Japanese footballers
Association football forwards
Senshu University alumni
J3 League players
Azul Claro Numazu players